The European Economic Area Act 1993 (c. 51) is an Act of the Parliament of the United Kingdom that incorporates the EEA Agreement signed in Brussels on 2 May 1992 that made provision for the free movement of persons, goods, services and capital within the European Single Market into the domestic law of the United Kingdom and amends the European Communities Act 1972 to incorporate the agreement within the list of the EC/EU treaties. It was given Royal assent on 5 November 1993.

The Act was amended by the European Union (Withdrawal) Act 2018 on 31 January 2020.

See also
 European Economic Area
 European Communities Act 1972
 Acts of Parliament of the United Kingdom relating to the European Communities (1957–1993) & European Union (1993–present)

Acts of the Parliament of the United Kingdom relating to the European Union
United Kingdom Acts of Parliament 1993
European Economic Area